Russell Cyril James Stone  (born 7 April 1923) is a New Zealand historian, author and professor emeritus at the University of Auckland. In 2012, the New Zealand Herald called him the leading authority on the history of Auckland, having written nine books on early Auckland history.

Born in Mount Eden in 1923, Stone was educated at Mount Albert Grammar School, and graduated from Auckland University College (now the University of Auckland) with a Bachelor of Arts degree in 1945, and a Master of Arts degree with first-class honours in 1949. After working as a secondary-school teacher, Stone was appointed to the staff of the history department at the University of Auckland in 1964, and completed a PhD in history in 1969. His thesis was titled Auckland business and businessmen in the 1880s, and was published in 1973 as Makers of Fortune: A Colonial Business Community and Its Fall. He retired in 1989 and was granted the title of professor emeritus.

The memoirs of John Logan Campbell were published in 1881. Stone republished these long out-of-print tales in his book: Poenamo: Romance and Reality of Antipodean Life in the Infancy of a New Colony. Stone had earlier written a two-volume life of Campbell,Young Logan Campbell (1982)and The Father and his Gift: John Logan Campbell's Later Years (1987).

In the 2002 New Year Honours, Stone was appointed an Officer of the New Zealand Order of Merit, for services to historical research. He was the joint winner of the biennial J.M. Sherrard Award in New Zealand local and regional history in 2004, for his book From Tamaki-Makau-rau to Auckland, published in 2001.

References

External links 
R. C. J. Stone – Auckland University Press

1923 births
Living people
University of Auckland alumni
New Zealand educators
Writers from Auckland
20th-century New Zealand historians
Academic staff of the University of Auckland
Officers of the New Zealand Order of Merit
People educated at Mount Albert Grammar School